The Mercury Theatre on the Air is a radio series of live radio dramas created and hosted by Orson Welles. The weekly hour-long show presented classic literary works performed by Welles's celebrated Mercury Theatre repertory company, with music composed or arranged by Bernard Herrmann. The series began July 11, 1938, as a sustaining program on the CBS Radio network, airing Mondays at 9 pm ET. On September 11, the show moved to Sundays at 8 pm.

The show made headlines with its "The War of the Worlds" broadcast on October 30, one of the most famous broadcasts in the history of radio due to the panic it allegedly caused, after which the Campbell Soup Company signed on as sponsor. The Mercury Theatre on the Air made its last broadcast on December 4 of that year, and The Campbell Playhouse began five days later, on December 9.

Production

After the theatrical successes of the Mercury Theatre, CBS Radio invited Orson Welles to create a summer show for 13 weeks. The series began July 11, 1938,

Orson Welles presented a special challenge to the CBS sound effects team, The New Yorker reported. "His programs called for all sorts of unheard-of effects, and he could be satisfied with nothing short of perfection." For the first episode, "Dracula", the sound team searched for the perfect sound of a stake being driven through the heart of the vampire. They first presented a savoy cabbage and a sharpened broomstick for Welles's approval. "Much too leafy," Welles concluded. "Drill a hole in the cabbage and fill it with water. We need blood." When that sound experiment also failed to satisfy Welles, he considered awhile—and asked for a watermelon. The New Yorker recalled the effect:

Welles stepped from the control booth, seized a hammer, and took a crack at the melon. Even the studio audience shuddered at the sound. That night, on a coast-to-coast network, he gave millions of listeners nightmares with what, even though it be produced with a melon and hammer, is indubitably the sound a stake would make piercing the heart of an undead body.
As the Mercury's second theatre season began in 1938, Welles and John Houseman were unable to write the Mercury Theatre on the Air broadcasts on their own. For "Hell on Ice" (October 8, 1938), the 14th episode of the series, they hired Howard E. Koch, whose experience in having a play performed by the Federal Theatre Project in Chicago led him to leave his law practice and move to New York to become a writer. The Mercury Theatre on the Air was a sustaining show underwritten by CBS, so in lieu of a more substantial salary Houseman gave Koch the rights to any script he worked on—including, to his literal good fortune, "The War of the Worlds". After five months Koch left the show for Hollywood; his last script was "The Glass Key" (March 10, 1939), by which time The Mercury Theatre on the Air was called The Campbell Playhouse.

Episodes

Awards
The Mercury Theatre on the Air was inducted into the National Radio Hall of Fame in 1988.

See also
The Campbell Playhouse

Notes

References

External links

1930s American radio programs
1938 radio programme debuts
1938 radio programme endings
American radio dramas
CBS Radio programs
Works by Orson Welles
Anthology radio series